Lawrence Regional Airport  is an airport three miles north of Lawrence, in Douglas County, Kansas, used for general aviation and air taxi.

Facilities
Runway 15/33 is 5,700 by 100 feet (1,737 x 30 m) asphalt and 1/19 is 3,901 by 75 feet (1,189 x 23 m) concrete.

In the year ending August 30, 2018 the airport had 23,000 aircraft operations with an average 63 per day: 93% general aviation, 6% air taxi and <1% military. 40 aircraft were based at the airport: 72.5%  single-engine (29), 12.5% multi-engine (5), 7.5% jet (3) and 7.5% helicopter (3).

In July 2019, the City of Lawrence granted permits to a $2.1 million construction project. The project, expected to be completed by the end of 2019, includes a 23,000 square foot hangar and an office space. It is designed in order to encourage more private charters out of the airport.

References

External links 
 Aerial photo as of 16 February 2002 from USGS The National Map
 

Airports in Kansas
Buildings and structures in Douglas County, Kansas